Sidima is a genus of butterflies in the family Lycaenidae.

Species
Sidima idamis (Fruhstorfer, 1917) Sumatra
Sidima murayamai Eliot & Kawazoé, 1983 Philippines
Sidima sulawesiana Eliot & Kawazoé, 1983 Celebes
Sidima amarylde Eliot & Kawazoé, 1983 New Guinea

References

Polyommatini
Lycaenidae genera